Patrick Leman is a British psychologist, currently Pro Vice-Chancellor at University of Waikato, New Zealand. He was formerly Dean of Education at the Institute of Psychiatry, Psychology and Neuroscience at King's College London. Head of the Department of Psychology and Associate Dean of Science at Royal Holloway, University of London, Chair of the British Psychological Society's Developmental Psychology Section, Editorial Advisory Group and Conference Committee. He has held posts at Goldsmiths College London and University of Cambridge. His principal research describes the ways in which children learn through communication with one another, often in informal, classroom contexts. He is Fellow of the British Psychological Society and editor of the British Journal of Developmental Psychology (2014-)

Career

Research 
Patrick Leman's research themes explore the intersection of epistemic and social issues in developmental and social psychology, often from an experimental perspective. His early work on peer conversation with Gerard Duveen developed new methods for understanding children's co-construction of knowledge that has subsequently become a core area of research in European developmental psychology.

He has also examined the role of gender in children's learning and, more recently, focused on issues of ethnicity and race in classroom contexts. Leman's work fuses social, developmental, cognitive and cultural psychology. More recent applied research has developed these theoretical ideas in classroom contexts to promote positive youth development including setting up, with colleagues, the White Water Writers charity.

Other work 
Together with colleagues Drs Joe Reddington and Yvonne Skipper, Leman is director of White Water Writers, a not-for-profit organisation that allows young people to write an original novel, collaboratively, in a week. The project has received funding from the Ernest Cook Trust and SHINE Foundation. He has also worked with the Laureus Foundation to evaluate the impact and effectiveness of sport-related interventions projects across the globe. He is a member of the Advisory Board of the Dame Alice Owen Foundation and an active member of the British Psychological Society and many other academic bodies.

Leman is Editor of the British Journal of Developmental Psychology and co-author, with Professor Andrew Bremner, of the popular text book "Developmental Psychology."

Biography 
Leman was born in Walthamstow and grew up in London. He attended St. Mary's School (Walthamstow), Nightingale School (Wanstead) and Bancroft's School (Woodford Green). He studied Psychology & Philosophy at St Edmund Hall, Oxford and a PhD in Developmental Psychology at Corpus Christi College, Cambridge. His postdoctoral career at University of Cambridge included a period as Director of Studies for Social & Political Sciences at Jesus College, Cambridge, where has also led the University's Indicators of Academic Performance Project, the first sustained attempt to understand the sources of gender, ethnic and other differences in university attainment.
He took a lectureship post at Goldsmiths University of London and subsequently at Royal Holloway, University of London where he was Head of the Department of Psychology and Associate Dean of Science. He joined King's College London as Dean of Education at the Institute of Psychiatry, Psychology and Neuroscience (IoPPN) in 2015. and Executive Dean and Head of the Institute (2016-) following the departure of Professor Shitij Kapur.

Personal life
Patrick Leman is married with four children.

References 

English psychologists
People from Walthamstow
Year of birth missing (living people)
Living people